Machairophora is a genus of moths in the subfamily Arctiinae first described by George Hampson in 1893. Two species are included, which are found from Sri Lanka and Papua New Guinea only.

Description
In male, antennae bipectinate (comb like on both sides) with short branches. Fore tibia with a short curved spine. Mid and hind tibia with long terminal spur pairs. Wings are covered with scales and hair. In forewings, veins 7 to 9 stalked, vein 11 arising from vein 10, then anastomosing (fusing) with vein 12. Hindwings with stalked veins 3 and 4, where the veins 6 and 7 on a very long stalk. Vein 8 from near end of cell.

Species
Machairophora fulvipuncta Hampson, 1893 (Sri Lanka)
Machairophora fumigata Pagenstecher, 1900 (Papua New Guinea)

References

Lithosiini
Moth genera